Kwangchon Tong clan is one of the Korean clans. Their Bon-gwan was in Hebei, China. According to the research held in 2000, the number of the Kwangchon Tong clan was 4130. Their founder was  who was a 43rd descendant of Dong Zhongshu in Han dynasty. He was naturalized in Korea during Goryeo period and contributed to founding the kingdom of Korea.

See also 
 Korean clan names of foreign origin

References

External links 
 

 
Dong clans
Korean clan names of Chinese origin